Anthony O'Garro (born October 8, 1987) is a Trinidadian footballer.

Career

College
O'Garro attended high school at Presentation College, and helped his school to a national championship in cricket and a conference title in soccer. He played two years of NAIA college soccer at Shorter College in Rome, Georgia.

O'Garro finished his Shorter career ranked third on the school's all-time assists list with 13 helpers and his 12 career goals rank fourth on the all-time charts. He was a two-time SSAC All-Academic selection and was honored as an NAIA Scholar-Athlete in 2009. He graduated in December, 2009 with a 3.5 grade point average and a Bachelor's Degree in Business Administration.

Professional
O'Garro signed his first professional contract in 2010 when he was signed by AC St. Louis of the USSF Division 2 Professional League. He made his professional debut - and scored his first professional goal - on April 17, 2010, in a game against the Austin Aztex.

References

External links
 AC St. Louis bio
 Shorter bio
 2010 Pro Soccer Combine profile
 Dak-Stats

1987 births
Living people
Trinidad and Tobago footballers
AC St. Louis players
Shorter University alumni
USSF Division 2 Professional League players
Association football defenders